Eulamprotes immaculatella is a moth of the family Gelechiidae. It was described by John William Douglas in 1850. It is found in Ireland, Great Britain, Portugal, Spain, France, the Netherlands, Germany and Denmark. It is found in a wide range of habitats, including sea cliffs, damp meadows, limestone pavements and grasslands.

The wingspan is 8–13 mm. The forewings are uniform blackish with a creamy spot on the costa. Adults are on wing from June to September.

The larvae feed within the stem of Hypericum species.

References

Moths described in 1850
Eulamprotes